Rosemead is a city in Los Angeles County, California, United States.  As of the 2021 census, it had a population of 50,245, currently dropping. Rosemead is part of a cluster of cities, along with Alhambra, Arcadia, Temple City, Monterey Park, San Marino, and San Gabriel, in the west San Gabriel Valley with a growing Asian-American population.

History 
Prior to the arrival of the Spanish, the area around Rosemead was populated by Native Americans known as the people of the willow houses or better known as the Kizh (pronounced Keech), alternatively Tongva or as the Spaniards renamed them, the Gabrieleños.  In 1771, the Spanish founded the first Mission San Gabriel Arcángel in the area that was formally known as the village of Shevaangna or Siba what is [first Angeleno William McCawley 1996] now known as La Mision Veija or Whittier Narrows on the border between Montebello and Rosemead. In 1775, the mission  moved to avoid the spring floods that ruined the first crops, to its present location in San Gabriel formally known as the village of Tovisvanga .

During the Spanish Colonial era, the area that is now the City of Rosemead was part of the land administered by the San Gabriel Mission.  As part of the Mexican government's Secularization Act of 1833, the land, formerly held by the Mission, was distributed to private citizens, requiring only that they build a house and graze cattle, bringing to an end the Mission Era   Following the Mexican–American War and the 1848 signing of the Treaty of Guadalupe which transferred sovereignty over the territory now known as the State of California to the United States, Anglo-American immigration began to flow to the area.  The southern part of Rosemead was part of Rancho Potrero Grande (Large Pasture) which was originally granted to a Native American man named Manuel Antonio, who was a "mayordomo" (overseer) at the San Gabriel Mission.  The  ranch was later transferred to Juan Matias Sánchez.

In 1852, John and Harriet Guess  moved cross-country in an ox drawn wagon, to the San Gabriel Valley from Conway County, Arkansas.  In 1855, the couple camped where present-day Savannah Elementary School is located on Rio Hondo Avenue. They rented the land until 1867, when John Guess purchased  of a  ranch and named it Savannah. The land stretched from Valley Boulevard to Marshall Street, and from Rosemead Boulevard to the Eaton Wash.

Other pioneers, Frank Forst and Leonard John Rose, also settled in this valley. Rose bred and trained horses for a living. He named his ranch "Rose's Meadow" which was eventually shortened to   Rosemeade and gave the city its name. Rosemeade  was once again shortened to Rosemead. The  peaceful, pastoral community  flourished with small truck farms and rabbit and chicken farms. Settlers moved in and also raised vegetables, fruits, grain and feed for the animals. It wasn't until August 4, 1959, the citizens elected to incorporate Rosemead into a city.

Rosemead Airport 
Rosemead Airport is one of the vanished former airports which once were spread all throughout the Los Angeles metropolitan area. Western Air College operated the airport. The airport at this location in Rosemead was apparently built at some point between 1940 and 1942, as it was not depicted on  a 1940 LA street map. The earliest depiction of this airport was on a 1942 street map, which labeled the field as the Western Air College Airport. At some point between 1942 and 1944 the airport was renamed Rosemead, as that is how it was labeled on the 1944 LA Sectional Aeronautical Chart (courtesy of John Voss). A flying school was also operated at Rosemead Airport.

Fletcher Aviation acquired the airport from the Heasley brothers during the Korean War and later sold to AJ Industries in the 1960s, AJ immediately sold the portion of the land from Rio Hondo Avenue almost to Rosemead Boulevard to AeroJet Corporation and they built a large facility there. It was named Flair Park and the roadway that parallels I-10 was named Flair Drive.

Demographics 
Rosemead is part of a cluster of cities (along with Arcadia, Temple City, Monterey Park, San Marino, and San Gabriel) in the west San Gabriel Valley with a growing Asian population. Rosemead  has a significant  population from Mexico, among other Latino nationalities. Less than 1% of the population is African-American or Native American.

2010 
The 2010 United States Census reported that Rosemead had a population of 53,764. The racial makeup of Rosemead was 11,348 (21.1%) White (4.7% Non-Hispanic White), 273 (0.5%) African American, 396 (0.7%) Native American, 32,617 (60.7%) Asian, 32 (0.1%) Pacific Islander, 7,940 (14.8%) from other races, and 1,158 (2.2%) from two or more races. Hispanic or Latino of any race were 18,147 persons (33.8%).

The Census reported that 53,351 people (99.2% of the population) lived in households, 135 (0.3%) lived in non-institutionalized group quarters, and 278 (0.5%) were institutionalized.

There were 14,247 households, out of which 6,267 (44.0%) had children under the age of 18 living in them, 8,028 (56.3%) were opposite-sex married couples living together, 2,502 (17.6%) had a female householder with no husband present, 1,373 (9.6%) had a male householder with no wife present.  There were 571 (4.0%) unmarried opposite-sex partnerships, and 74 (0.5%) same-sex married couples or partnerships. 1,739 households (12.2%) were made up of individuals, and 844 (5.9%) had someone living alone who was 65 years of age or older. The average household size was 3.74.  There were 11,903 families (83.5% of all households); the average family size was 3.99.

The population was spread out, with 12,231 people (22.7%) under the age of 18, 5,225 people (9.7%) aged 18 to 24, 14,952 people (27.8%) aged 25 to 44, 14,392 people (26.8%) aged 45 to 64, and 6,964 people (13.0%) who were 65 years of age or older.  The median age was 38.1 years. For every 100 females, there were 97.3 males.  For every 100 females age 18 and over, there were 94.9 males.

The homeowner vacancy rate was 0.9%; the rental vacancy rate was 3.2%.  26,324 people (49.0% of the population) lived in owner-occupied housing units and 27,027 people (50.3%) lived in rental housing units.

According to the 2010 United States Census, Rosemead had a median household income of $45,760, with 18.8% of the population living below the federal poverty line.

2000 
As of the census of 2000, there were 53,505 people, 13,913 households, and 11,632 families residing in the city. The population density was 10,398.3 inhabitants per square mile (4,011.3/km2). The racial makeup of the city was 26.57% White, 0.68% African American, 0.85% Native American, 48.76% Asian, 0.06% Pacific Islander, 19.69% from other races, and 3.38% from two or more races. Hispanic or Latino of any race were 41.30% of the population.

There were 14,110 households, out of which 40.3% had children under the age of 18 living with them, 59.7% were married couples living together, 13.6% had a female householder with no husband present, and 19.1% were non-families. 16.0% of all households were made up of individuals, and 5.7% had someone living alone who was 65 years of age or older.  The average household size was 3.70 and the average family size was 4.19.

In the city, the population was spread out, with 6.5% under the age of 5, 76.9% over the age of 18, and 15.2% over the age of 65.  The median age was 39 years. For every 100 females, there were 102.2 males.  For every 100 females age 18 and over, there were 99.7 males.

The median income for a household in the city was $44,115, and the median income for a family was $46,327. Males working full-time had a median income of $31,599 versus $28,456 for females. The per capita income for the city was $17,072.  About 11.6% of families and 12.9% of the population were below the poverty line, including 16.6% of those under age 18 and 8.3% of those age 65 or over.

Emergency services 

Fire protection in Rosemead is provided by the Los Angeles County Fire Department with ambulance transport by American Medical Response. The Los Angeles County Sheriff's Department provides law enforcement, operating out of the Temple City Station.

Economy 
Edison International, the international family of companies providing electric services, is headquartered in the city. Southern California Edison serves Rosemead, as well as much of Southern California.  The University of the West moved from its location from Hsi Lai Temple in Hacienda Heights to its current location in Rosemead in 1996 and is one of the first Buddhist funded universities in the United States. The Rosemead School of Psychology, which is now located with Biola University in La Mirada, was named after its original location in Rosemead and was the first independent professional school of psychology in the nation to be accredited by regional accrediting association. The Chinese cuisine fast food chain Panda Restaurant Group is headquartered in Rosemead. The Chinese-Vietnamese Sriracha red chili sauce (known to many as Rooster sauce) manufacturer Huy Fong Foods, Inc. (匯豐食品公司) is also based in the city.  The sauce is now being made at Huy Fong's plant in neighboring Irwindale.

Top employers 
According to the city's 2014 Comprehensive Annual Financial Report, the top employers in the city are:

Politics and Wal-Mart 

Controversies over the development of a Wal-Mart Super-center, in a residential section in the southern portion of the city, had been bitterly longstanding.  After some political maneuvering, it opened on September 13, 2006. A recall election to remove two council members that supported the Wal-Mart, Jay Imperial and Gary Taylor, was held on September 19, 2006. The voters defeated the recall in a 60 to 40 percent majority vote.  However, in the general elections that followed shortly thereafter on March 6, 2007, Polly Low defeated incumbent and former recall target Jay Imperial, garnering the highest vote count among the five candidates vying for the two open seats on the council.

Government

Local government 
Elections for the four year terms are held every two years in the odd-numbered years. The Council elects from its membership a Mayor to serve as its presiding officer for a one-year term.

City Council 2021:
 Mayor Polly Low  (Current term ends 2024)
 Mayor Pro Tem Sean Dang  (Current term ends 2024)
 Council Member Sandra Armenta  (Current term ends 2022)
 Council Member Margaret Clark  (Current term ends 2022)
 Council Member Steven Ly  (Current term ends 2022) - Inactive
 Council Member John Tang (Temporary appointed term ends 2022)

Administration:
 Gloria Molleda, City Manager
 Ericka Hernandez, City Clerk
 Thomas Boecking, Director of Parks and Recreation

Federal and state representation 
Before December 2012, Rosemead was located in California's 32nd congressional district, which had a Cook Partisan Voting Index of D +17.

Geography 
Rosemead is located at  (34.070, -118.082).

The city is bordered to the north by San Gabriel and Temple City, to the east by El Monte, and South El Monte, to the south by the unincorporated area of South San Gabriel and Montebello and to the west by San Gabriel and Monterey Park.

Infrastructure 
The Los Angeles County Sheriff's Department (LASD) operates the Temple Station in Temple City, serving Rosemead.

The Los Angeles County Department of Health Services operates the Monrovia Health Center in Monrovia, serving Rosemead.

Education 
Rosemead is served by two elementary school districts: Garvey School District and Rosemead School District. Each of these districts overlaps with a high school district; the former overlaps with the Alhambra Unified School District and the latter overlaps with a portion of the El Monte Union High School District.

There is one public high school--Rosemead High School (of El Monte UHS)—in the city and three public middle schools: Muscatel Middle School, Richard Garvey Intermediate School and Roger W. Temple Intermediate School. The portion in Garvey SD with Alhambra USD high school zoning is zoned to San Gabriel High School. A portion is also zoned to the Montebello Unified School District.

Don Bosco Technical Institute, a private Catholic high school for boys.

University of the West has been located in Rosemead since 1996. UWest is Rosemead's only Western Association of Schools and Colleges accredited campus.

Places of interest 
The Dinsmoor Heritage House is a bijou museum that houses, preserves and displays a showcase of the colorful and rich history of the City of Rosemead.  Once a private home, it was built in the late 1920s by Adelberrt Dinsmoor, son of one of Rosemead's pioneers, Raphael Dinsmoor. Currently closed to undergoing refurbishing,  it will again conduct monthly tours and host a variety of special events when completed. It is located at 9642 Steele Street.

The Marinelli Stadium, named in memory of Rod Marinelli, formerly the head coach of the Detroit Lions, is located at Rosemead High School.  "Rod Marinelli Stadium" appears in lights above the scoreboard and an encrypted bronze marker is placed at the southern edge of the field on a large  stone.

There are two community centers in Rosemead that offer multi-purpose facilities for a large variety of occasions as well as  senior activities, adult education programs, youth and adult classes, as well as two preschools.

The city has completed a complete renovation, from the ground up, at both city aquatic centers.  Rosemead Aquatic Center, located in Rosemead Park, features swim, water polo and diving facilities as well as swim classes and recreation areas. Garvey Aquatic Center is now a state of the art recreational aquatic facility featuring water slides, interactive play areas and a lesson pool. Showers at both pools have been updated for resource efficiency. The city completed these plans on schedule for the summer of 2011.  Garvey Aquatic Center was funded entirely through a grant from the State of California. Rosemead Aquatic Center was funded by bond proceeds.

City parks 
Garvey Park, located at 7933 Emerson Place.
Rosemead Park and 1/2-Mile Fitness Trail located at 4343 Encinita Avenue.
 Klingerman Park, located at 8800 Klingerman Avenue.
Sally Tanner Park, at 8343 E Mission Drive.
Zapopan Park, at 3018 N. Charlotte Avenue.
 Jay Imperial Park, located at 2373 Pine Street.

Savannah Pioneer Cemetery 

Before the Civil War, many Southern families settled in El Monte, then called Lexington. The community of Rosemead, then called Savannah,  is located adjacent to El Monte and is situated above the water table. The slightly elevated land made it the logical alternative as the burial site for residents of swampy Lexington. The first known burial was in 1846, five years before most of the settlers arrived. Today the 41/2 acre cemetery, with 200 plots remaining of its original 3,000, is  privately owned by the El Monte Cemetery Association.  When the City of Rosemead started to widen Valley Boulevard in the 1920s, construction crews unearthed dozens of corpses outside the fence of the cemetery. The majority of the skeletons were reburied in a mass grave inside the cemetery proper, but some were so deteriorated that the workers left them undisturbed and simply paved over them so that there are more graves scattered under Valley Boulevard and beneath adjacent area businesses. The area also was a Native American burial ground before the bodies of settlers filled the cemetery.
Savannah Pioneer Cemetery is located at the intersection of Mission Drive and Valley Boulevard. It is reputed to be the oldest Protestant cemetery in Los Angeles County. The El Monte Cemetery Association, incorporated in 1920, is responsible for the maintenance and upkeep of the cemetery. The association's funding comes from private donations and fundraising activities.

Shopping 
A small portion of the Montebello Town Center is actually located within Rosemead city limits. It features major department stores, smaller shops and a small food court. The boundary line between Montebello and Rosemead runs through the eastern end of the shopping mall. Policing is provided by the City of Montebello.

There is an Asian shopping center on Garvey Avenue in Rosemead, formerly The Diamond Square Shopping Center, featuring many restaurants and many Chinese shops. Nearby is The Square Supermarket featuring Korean and Vietnamese foods.  Rosemead Square Shopping Center is located on Rosemead Boulevard near the South El Monte and El Monte city limits.

Salary schedule, City officials 
In light of the recent scandals involving neighboring towns, Rosemead has publicly posted its salary schedule for the city officials.

Media 
Rosemead community news are covered on the San Gabriel Valley Tribune which is a paid daily newspaper and Mid-Valley News and Rosemead Reader, which are community weeklies.

Notable people 
Isaias Hellman, German-Jewish banker and philanthropist, and a founding father of the University of Southern California
Taboo (of The Black Eyed Peas)
Toscha Seidel, violinist
Vikki Carr, singer
Bob Mackie, fashion designer
Rod Marinelli, defensive coordinator, Dallas Cowboys, born in Rosemead
Prima J, musical group
Jose Flores, MLB baseball player
Audie Desbrow (drummer for rock band Great White), born and raised in Rosemead.

Sister cities 
 Keelung, Taiwan
 Zapopan, Jalisco, Mexico

See also

References

External links 

official City of Rosemead website
Rosemead Chamber of Commerce

 
Cities in Los Angeles County, California
Communities in the San Gabriel Valley
Incorporated cities and towns in California